National Institute for Educational Research may refer to:

 China National Institute for Educational Research
 Institut national de recherche pédagogique (France)
 National Institute for Educational Policy Research (Japan), previously known as National Institute for Educational Research